The North Dakota Insurance Commissioner regulates the insurance industry in North Dakota, United States. 
The following is a list of those that have held the position.

See also
North Dakota Insurance Commissioner

External links
State of North Dakota official website

Government of North Dakota
Insurance